Jirkov is a town in Chomutov District in the Ústí nad Labem Region of the Czech Republic. It has about 19,000 inhabitants. Jirkov creates a conurbation with Chomutov.

Administrative parts

Town parts and villages of Březenec, Červený Hrádek, Jindřišská and Vinařice are administrative parts of Jirkov.

Geography
Jirkov lies in close proximity to the city of Chomutov, with which it forms a conurbation. It lies on the border between the Most Basin and Ore Mountains. The Bílina River flows through the town.

History
Jirkov was established as a colonization village on the Czech-Saxon border in the second half of the 13th century. The first written mention of Jirkov is from 1321 under the name Borek, the name Jirkov (that time written Jurkov) began to be used soon after.

Until 1918, the town was part of the Austrian monarchy (Austria side after the compromise of 1867), in the Komotau (Chomutov) district, one of the 94 Bezirkshauptmannschaften in Bohemia. From 1938 to 1945 it was one of the municipalities in Sudetenland. After the surrender of Germany, nearly all of the town's hitherto inhabitants were expelled, and new Czech settlers found a new home in the depopulated town.

Demographics

Transport
Jirkov is situated on the railway line Prague–Cheb of national significance, and on the regional railway line from Kadaň and Chomutov to Ústí nad Labem and Děčín.

Jirkov and neighbouring Chomutov together operate a transport company. In addition to buses, public transport is provided also by trolleybuses.

Sport
Every year the town organizes the Jirkov Crossmarathon and Half marathon. The tradition began in 2001.

Sights

Červený Hrádek Castle

Červený Hrádek Castle (formerly Borek Castle) was founded by the Kraa family prior to 1415. The castle was sacked by the Hussites in 1421 and, after renovation later in the 15th century, the façade was painted red – hence the name Červený Hrádek (or Red Castle). In 1687 and 1688, the baroque sculptor Jan Brokoff carved statues, fountains and other works at the castle. His son Ferdinand Maxmilian Brokoff, also a sculptor, was born there.

The last aristocratic family to own the castle were the Hohenlohe-Langenburgs. Max Egon Hohenlohe, the last owner, tried to prevent the occupation of Czechoslovakia by Nazi Germany through diplomatic negotiations when he allowed the meeting of the British mediator in the dispute between Germany and Czechoslovakia over the Sudetenland, Lord Runciman, with the leader of the Sudeten German Party, Konrad Henlein, at the castle in August 1938. After World War II, Prince Max Egon was expropriated by the communist government.

Accessible areas of the castle include the castle's chapel, the hall of mirrors, the gallery and the study of Max Egon Hohenlohe.

Town cellars
Long Cellar, also called Sand Cellar, was built in 1555. It was built for 40 years and it had 150 counters. Long Cellar served to the brewery and to a beer storage. Thanks to this, the beer was better. Beer was brewed in Jirkov from 1443. People brewed beer in the 16th and 17th centuries. A brewery was built near the cellar in 1841; thanks to this, Long Cellar lost importance.

Since 2006, the town cellars are accessible for visitors. Since 2011, the town cellars has been protected as a cultural monument.

Church of Saint Giles
The oldest monument in Jirkov is the Church of Saint Giles. Its existence was mentioned already in 1300. It was newly built in 1568, the original parts of the building have been preserved.

Notable people
Ferdinand Brokoff (1688–1731), sculptor
Augusta Rozsypalová (1857–1925), teacher and politician
David Kämpf (born 1995), ice hockey player

Twin towns – sister cities

Jirkov is twinned with:
 Bátonyterenye, Hungary
 Brand-Erbisdorf, Germany
 Kobylnica, Poland
 Šentjur, Slovenia

Gellary

References

External links

Populated places in Chomutov District
Cities and towns in the Czech Republic
Towns in the Ore Mountains